Lonesome Luke, Plumber is a 1917 American short comedy film starring Harold Lloyd.

Cast
 Harold Lloyd as Lonesome Luke
 Snub Pollard
 Bebe Daniels
 Bud Jamison
 Gilbert Pratt
 Max Hamburger
 Arthur Harrison
 Sammy Brooks
 W.L. Adams
 David Voorhees
 Clara Lucas
 Pearl Novci
 Gus Leonard

See also
 Harold Lloyd filmography

References

External links

1917 films
1917 comedy films
Silent American comedy films
American black-and-white films
1917 short films
American silent short films
Films directed by Hal Roach
Lonesome Luke films
American comedy short films
1910s American films